{{Infobox musical artist
| name             = Liz McClarnon
| image            = Liz McClarnon War of The Worlds.jpg
| image_size       = 250px
| caption          = McClarnon performing in Jeff Wayne's The War of the Worlds, 2010
| background       = solo_singer
| birth_name       = Elizabeth Margaret McClarnon
| birth_date       = 
| origin           = Liverpool, England
| genre            = Pop
| occupation       = Singer, dancer, television presenter
| years_active     = 1997–present
| label            = All Around the World (EMI)/Hollywood Records
| associated_acts  = Atomic Kitten
| website          = 
}}

Elizabeth Margaret McClarnon (born 10 April 1981) is an English pop singer, songwriter, dancer, television presenter and actress. She is the longest serving member of the girl group Atomic Kitten, with whom she has scored three number-one singles and also two number-one albums. In 2006, she went solo and the group reformed in 2012 as part of The Big Reunion. McClarnon co-wrote several Atomic Kitten songs, including the UK top 10 hits "See Ya", "I Want Your Love" and "Someone Like Me".

Outside of her music career, McClarnon was the winner of UK cookery show Celebrity MasterChef in 2008.

Atomic Kitten
In 1997, while McClarnon was still in secondary school, her music teacher arranged for her to take part in an audition with OMD frontman Andy McCluskey, who was aiming to create a new girl group. The group became Atomic Kitten, made up of McClarnon, Kerry Katona and Natasha Hamilton, and they released their first record in 1999. Katona left the group in 2001 and was replaced by Jenny Frost.

Atomic Kitten have had three UK number one singles, "Whole Again", "Eternal Flame", and "The Tide Is High (Get the Feeling)". They also had two UK number one albums, Right Now, and Feels So Good, both being certified double-platinum in the UK for sales of over 600,000 copies each. The total worldwide sales are estimated at 6.2 million singles and 4 million albums. Liz is the only member of the group to write any material.

On 4 March 2012, it was confirmed that the original line-up of Atomic Kitten – McClarnon, Hamilton and Katona – would reform for The Big Reunion, along with five other pop groups of their time – 911, Honeyz, B*Witched, Five and Liberty X.

Solo career
Following Atomic Kitten, McClarnon was signed to All Around the World Records. She released her first solo single, a cover of Barbra Streisand's 1980 hit "Woman in Love", on 13 February 2006. The track was produced by Graham Stack along with Robin Gibb of the Bee Gees, who also originally co-wrote the song
and whom McClarnon accompanied on her 2005 tour.

A video was released to promote the song featuring McClarnon in a Manhattan apartment, but it was actually filmed in McClarnon's home town of Liverpool. It was decided to release the single as a double A-side with a cover of Jackie Wilson's "I Get the Sweetest Feeling". The single peaked at number 5 in the UK Singles Chart and, after more than six months on release, it peaked at number 16 in the Spanish charts on 22 October 2006. Also, prior to her solo release, McClarnon appeared in the video for "Da Ya Think I'm Sexy?" with the FHM Hot 100, which charted at number 10 in the UK.

Since her first release, McClarnon has gone on to release one more single called "Don't It Make You Happy". The song was recorded in her bid to be selected for the UK's entry for the Eurovision Song Contest 2007 and McClarnon performed the track on the BBC's pre-Eurovision TV show Making Your Mind Up on 17 March 2007. However, she was unsuccessful and the single failed to chart.  The competition was won by pop band Scooch.

McClarnon also recorded a single entitled "Lately", with friend Jaime Jay for the Global One Music Project. The same song has been recorded by different artists all around the world in different languages, and, in addition to English, McClarnon also recorded French and Spanish versions. The single was due to be released 18 May 2009, and although McClarnon and Jay promoted the single on a number of radio and TV shows, the release was postponed. Indefinitely.

Since then, McClarnon has continued recording her debut album. She parted ways with her old management company in April 2008, and is now managed by her ex-marketing manager, Scott Richardson at Belta CM.

On 27 December 2006 McClarnon appeared in the ITV documentary "The Girl With the Golden Hair", together with Richard O’Brien ("The Rocky Horror Show"). The documentary tells the story of the creation of the mini-rock opera of the same name, performed by the band ABBA during their 1977 European and Australian tour. McClarnon performs the three published numbers from that show; "Thank You for the Music", "I Wonder (Departure)" and "I’m a Marionette".

On 3 August 2009, McClarnon signed to 3 Beat Records, a subsidiary of All Around the World (through Universal Music). Her first single on the new label, "Not in Love", was due to be released in November 2009, and is a track she has written herself, influenced by Kylie Minogue's electro and club tunes. McClarnon performed the track at the Midlands Festival in 2009.

Her debut TV show, Hotter Than My Daughter, aired at the beginning of February 2010 for six weeks, on BBC Three.

In late 2010 and early 2011, she played Beth in Jeff Wayne's Musical Version of The War of the Worlds.

Following this, from 8 July to 17 September 2011, McClarnon was cast as Paulette in the first UK tour of Legally Blonde The Musical. She starred in the Cinderella'' pantomime in the Liverpool Empire in 2012, playing the lead role.

In 2018, she performed at the C2C: Country to Country festival at the O2 Arena.

Discography

Solo releases

References

External links

1981 births
Atomic Kitten members
Living people
Musicians from Liverpool
Reality cooking competition winners
McClarnon, Liz
21st-century British women singers
All Around the World Productions artists